Granville Gustavus Withers (January 17, 1905 – March 27, 1959) was an American film actor who acted under the screen name Grant Withers. With early beginnings in the silent era, Withers moved into sound films, establishing himself with a list of headlined features as a young and handsome male lead. "As his career progressed ... his importance diminished, but he did manage a 10-year contract with Republic."

His friendships with both John Ford and John Wayne secured him a spot in nine of Wayne's films, but later roles dwindled to supporting roles, mainly as villains in B-movies, serials, and television.

Early life and career
"Born in Pueblo, Colorado, Withers worked as an oil company salesman and newspaper reporter before breaking into films near the end of the silent era." His more-than-30-year acting career took off in the late 1920s. While in his twenties, he was a leading man over rising talent James Cagney in Other Men's Women (1931).

The comedy short So Long Bill (1926) marked Withers's film debut.

Withers's early work had him opposite actors such as W.C. Fields, Buster Keaton, Boris Karloff, Mae West, and Shirley Temple. Appearing in The Red-Haired Alibi (1932) with Temple, he played the role of her first on-screen parent.

Starring roles in major pictures later dwindled to supporting parts, mainly as villains in B-movies and serials. Notable exceptions included a 12-part Jungle Jim movie serial (1937), starring Withers and released by Universal Pictures, and the recurring role of the brash police captain Bill Street in the five-film Monogram Pictures series Mr. Wong, starring Boris Karloff, beginning in 1938. He was under a Republic Pictures contract from February 1944 through April 1954. Withers's credits at Republic total about 60 films from 1937 to 1957.

After 1940, he was a character actor and tough guy in westerns. He took numerous supporting roles in television as his popularity in films waned. He guest-starred as baseball coach Whitey Martin in the 1956 episode "The Comeback" on Crossroads. He was cast as Gus Andrews and Miles Breck, respectively, in two episodes, titled "The time for All Good Men" (1957) and "King of the Frontier" (1958), on The Life and Legend of Wyatt Earp, starring Hugh O'Brian.

In 1956, he played “Jed Lardner” (a callous cowboy who left his injured partner to die) in S2E15, “Pucket’s New Year”, on the TV western 
Gunsmoke. In 1958, Withers portrayed wealthy rancher Sam Barton in the episode "The Return of Dr. Thackeray" of Have Gun—Will Travel. He also appeared in two other Have Gun—Will Travel episodes. That year, he played Charles Stewart Brent, owner of the Brent Building in Los Angeles, where Perry Mason had his office, and the defendant in the Perry Mason episode "The Case of the Gilded Lily."

In 1959, shortly before his death, Withers was cast in the episode "Feeling His Oats" on the children's western series Fury, starring Peter Graves and Bobby Diamond. He also appeared that year as Sheriff Charlie Clayton in the episode "A Matter of Friendship" in John Bromfield's crime drama U.S. Marshal. His last film role was in the 1959 Roger Corman crime drama I Mobster. His last TV role, also in 1959, was as Ed Martin in "The Ringer" episode of the Rory Calhoun western series The Texan.

In total, Withers appeared in some 200 film and television roles.

Personal life
In 1930, he eloped to Yuma, Arizona, with 17-year-old actress Loretta Young. The marriage ended in annulment in 1931 just as their second movie together, titled Too Young to Marry, was released. He also was married to Gladys Joyce Walsh.

Some of Withers's later screen appearances were arranged through the auspices of his friends John Ford and John Wayne. He appeared in nine movies with John Wayne, including Fort Apache (1948) and Rio Grande (1950).

Wayne was best man at Withers's fifth marriage, to 24-year-old Cuban-born actress Estelita Rodriguez  in January 1953 in Reno, Nevada. They resided in the San Fernando Valley on Woodcliff Avenue in Sherman Oaks, California. Estelita began a nightclub singing career at the end of her Republic contract. The marriage was not a happy one, and they divorced in 1955. A noticeable weight gain became apparent in his films as his career progressed. In later years, back problems were among his health issues.

Death 
Withers died on March 27, 1959, in his Hollywood apartment at age 54. With failing health, he committed suicide by overdosing on barbiturates. Withers left a suicide note that read: "Please forgive me, my family. I was so unhappy. It's better this way." He is interred at Forest Lawn Memorial Park in Glendale, California.

Selected filmography

References

External links 

 
 
 Interview at the New York Times
 Photographs and literature

20th-century American male actors
Male actors from Colorado
American male film actors
American male silent film actors
American male television actors
Burials at Forest Lawn Memorial Park (Glendale)
Drug-related suicides in California
Male Western (genre) film actors
1905 births
1959 suicides
People from Pueblo, Colorado
Barbiturates-related deaths